Trick is a 2019 American slasher film directed by Patrick Lussier and starring Jamie Kennedy and Omar Epps.

Plot
In 2015 in Benton, New York, high school senior Patrick "Trick" Weaver is playing spin the bottle at a Halloween party using a knife with "TRICK" and "TREAT" carved into opposite sides of the handle when it lands on another boy. The other players tease Trick, telling him to kiss the other boy. Trick grabs the knife and stabs five teens to death before being stabbed with a fire poker. At the hospital, Det. Mike Denver wishes to remove the Halloween face paint hiding Trick's face but Trick flips the hospital bed and escapes, slaughtering people throughout the hospital using surgical equipment. Det. Mike Denver and Sheriff Lisa Jayne shoot Trick several times and he falls out of a window onto the road below but then disappears into the river. During police interviews, Troy states that he stabbed Trick with the poker but the students provide contradictory descriptions of Trick's appearance. No one has ever met Trick's parents, Trick's registered address turns out to be a dockyard, and the two-faced pumpkin mask that Trick was wearing at the party disappears from evidence.

In 2016, Trick uses the same knife to kill students and teachers at a high school Halloween dance in Riverton, New York. In 2017, more bodies are found at a Halloween party in Hudson Village, New York. On October 30, 2018, Det. Denver warns two agents in Shady Creek, New York that Trick could attack there because they are located along the same river where all of his attacks have occurred. While in a bar, Trick surprises them and kills the two agents.

On October 30, 2019, Trick leaves the message "DENVER" in blood at a murder site in Benton. The next day a masked Trick surprises the now unemployed Denver outside his car and is chased through the cemetery before disappearing. Trick fakes text messages from Denver to lure Deputy Green to the old crane barge, where he injures her with a booby trap then kills her by using a crane to swing a gravestone through the windshield where she is sitting. Sheriff Jayne notes that the gravestone belongs to Agent Christina Mendez, whom Trick killed the previous year. Trick begins killing people in Talbott's haunted maze. Cheryl, a survivor of the original killings in 2015, sees Trick wielding the carved knife. Trick stabs Nicki so Det. Denver sends her to the hospital and Cheryl accompanies her, where Cheryl finds that Trick has killed her hospitalized father. Troy confesses to Det. Denver that Cheryl was the one who stabbed Trick with the fire poker, so Det. Denver and Sheriff Jayne rush to the hospital and find Cheryl held captive by Trick. Trick stabs Det. Denver and Sheriff Jayne multiple times before Cheryl shoots him. When Trick seems unaffected, Det. Denver jumps with Trick out the window onto a car.

Multiple individuals wearing Trick's face paint arrive and Det. Denver realizes that a group of devotees have been carrying out the bidding of the real Patrick Weaver, who arrives in a wheelchair and joins the others in stabbing Det. Denver. Cheryl arrives and notices the scar on the stomach of a nearby man in a wheelchair, whom she pursues back into the hospital. She sees him discard a pumpkin mask into the garbage and begin deleting the hospital's video surveillance footage. Patrick lets her into the room, where they struggle before she uses her self-defense training to use the knife against him and stab him in the stomach. Patrick dies after wheezing out his final words "one of us". Deputy Slater tells Sheriff Jayne that Det. Denver was stabbed to death but Sheriff Jayne notices some face paint remaining on his cheek. Slater attacks her but Cheryl uses the carved knife to stab him. Sheriff Jayne takes the knife from her and stabs him again. The remaining devotees of Trick travel onward to recruit more followers while Cheryl, Sheriff Jayne, and Det. Denver continue to track and pursue them.

Cast

 Jamie Kennedy as Dr. Steven
 Omar Epps as Det. Mike Denver
 Tom Atkins as Talbott
 Alex Breaux as Len
 Ellen Adair as Lisa Jayne, Sheriff of Benton County
 Vanessa Aspillaga as Agent Tina Mendez
 Kristina Reyes as Cheryl Winston
 Thom Niemann as Patrick Weaver
 Todd Farmer as Deputy Wan
 Gary J. Tunnicliffe as Principal
 Aaron Dalla Villa as Smooth Johnny
 Dani Shay as Deputy Green
 Summer Crockett Moore as Patricia Denver
 Hillary Greer as Nurse Helen
 Jerome Charvet as Deputy Slater
 Melody Hu as Janice
 Sasha Diamond as Deputy Iris Reddick
 Robert G. McKay as Agent Swift
 Adrienne Rose Bengtsson as Brooke
 Allen Wall as Short Scared Ghost
 Kya Brickhouse as Nicki
 Max Miller as Troy
 Raith Kell as Thomas the Orderly
 Kevin A. Wall as Diner Client
 Tony Mitchell as Chief Gunn
 Robert M. Jimenez as Cheryl's Dad
 Ana-Maria Corizo as Cheryl's Mother
 Austin Ferris as Student

Production
Dermot Mulroney was originally cast to play Det. Mike Denver but Omar Epps ended up playing the role in the film.

Filming took place in Middletown, Beacon, and Warwick, New York, as well as the Umbra Sound Stages in Newburgh, New York.

Release
The film was released in the United States on October 18, 2019.

Reception
The site's critical consensus reads, "Fast-paced savagery and a memorable twist aren't enough to make up for Tricks slavish devotion to superior slasher films of the past." Frank Scheck of The Hollywood Reporter called Trick "a slasher film with a dull edge" and wrote that "the film goes down an extremely predictable path, mainly buying time between killing sprees". Brian Tallerico of RogerEbert.com gave the film 1½, calling it "more incoherent than terrifying". Meagan Navarro of Bloody Disgusting wrote that "it’s clear that Lussier and Farmer are operating at a sub-standard level" and that "at every level, from technical to story, Trick is a joyless affair."

The film earned $48,953 at the global box office.

References

External links
 

2019 films
2019 horror films
2010s serial killer films
2010s slasher films
American slasher films
American splatter films
Films directed by Patrick Lussier
Films scored by Michael Wandmacher
Films set in 2015
Films set in 2016
Films set in 2017
Films set in 2018
Films set in 2019
Films set in New York (state)
Films shot in New York (state)
Halloween horror films
Films with screenplays by Todd Farmer
African-American horror films
2010s English-language films
2010s American films